WWGH-LP (107.1 FM) was a radio station licensed to serve the community of Marion, Ohio. It aired a community radio format.

The station was assigned the WWGH-LP call letters by the Federal Communications Commission on April 25, 2014.

The station's license was revoked on February 12, 2021, due to failure to respond to correspondence from the FCC, a violation of Section 73.3568(a) of the FCC regulations. The FCC restored the station's license on February 17, to give the board more time to respond.

On March 4, 2022, the FCC issued a Hearing Designation Order, Notice of Opportunity for Hearing, and Notice of Apparent Liability for Forfeiture (Order) and commenced a hearing to determine whether The Marion Education Exchange (MEE) has committed violations of the Communications Act of 1934, as amended (Act) and/or the rules and regulations (Rules) of the Federal Communications Commission (Commission), and, as a consequence, whether MEE's application (Renewal Application) to renew the license of low power FM radio station WWGH-LP, Marion, Ohio (Station) should be granted or denied pursuant to section 309(k) of the Act, and whether a forfeiture should be imposed against MEE.

On August 16, 2022, the FCC dismissed the license renewal application with prejudice. The order mentioned a possible misrepresentation and lack of candor by the licensee in responding to the FCC. The license was not renewed.

References

External links
 Official Website
 

WGH-LP
WGH-LP
Radio stations established in 2014
2014 establishments in Ohio
Defunct community radio stations in the United States
Marion County, Ohio
Defunct radio stations in the United States
Radio stations disestablished in 2022
2022 disestablishments in Ohio